Rebecca A. Balint (born May 4, 1968) is an American politician who is a member of the United States House of Representatives from Vermont's at-large congressional district as a member of the Democratic Party. She served as a member of the Vermont Senate from Windham County from 2015 to 2023, as majority leader from 2017 to 2021, and as president pro tempore from 2021 to 2023.

Balint was born in Heidelberg, West Germany, and raised in Peekskill, New York. She was educated at Walter Panas High School, Smith College, Harvard University, and University of Massachusetts Amherst. She moved to Vermont in 1994, and worked as a teacher, rock-climbing instructor, and columnist for the Brattleboro Reformer, and was active in local politics. Balint was elected to the State Senate in 2014, becoming the first lesbian to serve there. She was selected to serve as majority leader and later elected president pro tempore, the first woman and openly LGBT person to do so in Vermont.

Balint was elected to the U.S. House in the 2022 election. She is the first woman and openly LGBT person to represent Vermont in Congress. This was also a national milestone, as Vermont was the only state that had not previously elected a woman to Congress.

Early life and education
Rebecca A. Balint was born at the United States Army hospital in Heidelberg, West Germany, on May 4, 1968, the daughter of Peter and Sandra (Couchman) Balint, and raised in Peekskill, New York. Her grandfather was killed during the Holocaust and her Hungarian-Jewish father immigrated to the U.S. in 1957. She graduated from Walter Panas High School in 1986. In the sixth grade, she admitted to having a crush on a female classmate, for which other students taunted her, including writing "lezzie" on her locker; she came out to her friends after high school and to her parents while she was in college. Balint became interested in politics at an early age, which she later attributed to having been raised in a family affected by the Holocaust and observing how government actions affect women and minorities, including gays and lesbians.

Balint attended Barnard College of Columbia University before transferring to Smith College. She graduated magna cum laude from Smith with a Bachelor of Arts degree in history and women's studies in 1990, received a Master of Education degree from Harvard University in 1995, and completed a Master of Arts degree in history from the University of Massachusetts Amherst in 2000. At Smith College, Balint was coxswain for the women's crew team, who nicknamed her "the Admiral" because of her leadership skills.

Balint moved to Vermont in 1994, and taught middle school history and social studies and worked as a rock-climbing instructor at Farm & Wilderness summer camps in Plymouth, Vermont, in addition to teaching at the Community College of Vermont in Brattleboro and writing a column for the Brattleboro Reformer. She met Elizabeth Wohl in 2000; they formed a civil union in 2004, moved to Brattleboro in 2007, and got married in 2009, after same-sex marriage was legalized in Vermont. They have two children.

Balint supported the Vermont Progressive Party in the 2000s, and supported their gubernatorial nominee, Anthony Pollina, in the 2000 election. She served as a town meeting representative and on the Development Review Board in Brattleboro.

Vermont Senate

Elections

In 2014, Balint announced her campaign for a Vermont Senate seat from the two-member Windham district. She raised the most money in the race, around $13,000, with donations from people such as Jane Lynch, and was endorsed by Majority Leader Philip Baruth. Windham County Democratic Party chair Brandon Batham served as her campaign manager; he later served as a member of the city council in Barre and operations manager for the Vermont Democratic Party before being accused of embezzling party funds.

With one incumbent, Democrat Peter Galbraith, not running for reelection, Balint and the other incumbent, Jeanette White, won the Democratic nominations and Balint won a seat by placing second in the 2014 general election, ahead of an independent and two Liberty Union candidates. Her election made her the first lesbian to serve in the state senate. She was reelected in 2016, 2018, and 2020 against independent, Liberty Union, and Republican candidates.

Tenure

In 2017, the State Senate voted 20 to 10, with Balint in favor, to suspend Senator Norman H. McAllister following accusations of sexual assault, his arrest in May 2015, in the Vermont State House, and a criminal trial against him. Balint served as the chair of the Senate Sexual Harassment Panel. She also served on the Economic Development, Housing and General Affairs, Finance, and Rules Committees. The Democratic caucus unanimously voted to make Balint majority leader in 2017. In 2020, the Democratic caucus selected her to succeed Tim Ashe as president pro tempore of the Vermont Senate, and she became the first woman and LGBT person to serve in the role.

During the 2016 election she was a member of the Victory Leaders Councils formed by the Democratic National Committee. During the 2020 Democratic presidential primaries she and other members of the Vermont General Assembly declined to endorse any candidate for president.

U.S. House of Representatives

Elections

On November 15, 2021, Senator Patrick Leahy announced that he would not seek reelection to the United States Senate in 2022. Peter Welch, the member of the United States House of Representatives from Vermont's at-large congressional district, announced that he would run to replace Leahy.

On December 13, Balint announced that she would seek the Democratic nomination to succeed Welch in the 2022 election. Balint selected Natalie Silver, Welch's former communications director, to manage her campaign. She raised over $125,000 within 24 hours of her announcement. Balint said she would follow Bernie Sanders's example by not accepting campaign contributions from corporate political action committees, but accepting political action committee donations from labor unions. She won the Democratic nomination and defeated Republican nominee Liam Madden in the general election.

The Campaign Legal Center stated that her campaign website was using red-boxing, a practice that allows a campaign to coordinate with super PACs. During the primary, the LGBTQ Victory Fund spent around $1 million on Balint's behalf, with most of it coming from a $1.1 million donation from FTX executive Nishad Singh. Sam Bankman-Fried donated $26,100 to Balint.

Committees 
Budget
 Oversight and Accountability

Caucus memberships

 Congressional Progressive Caucus
 Congressional Equality Caucus (Co-Chair)

Political positions

Balint sponsored legislation to limit police involvement with immigration enforcement by the federal government, opposing President Donald Trump's support for a federal registry on religious and immigration status. She voted to expand background checks on gun sales in 2018. The Vermont Conservation Voters gave her a lifetime score of 100%.

Balint opposes voter identification on the grounds that voter fraud is extremely rare and that voter ID laws are used to restrict people from voting. She supported legislation that sent all voters mail-in ballots and said that it was a part of Vermont's legacy of making voting easier. She sponsored legislation to implement ranked choice voting for presidential and congressional elections in Vermont.

Balint supported legislation to prohibit conversion therapy on minors. She supported legislation banning the gay panic defense, which passed unanimously in the state senate, but was unable to vote for it because she was presiding in place of Lieutenant Governor Molly Gray. She and Speaker Jill Krowinski gave an apology for Vermont's involvement in eugenics, including legislation from 1931 that supported a eugenics study conducted by Henry Farnham Perkins. In 2021, an amendment to the Constitution of Vermont to codify Roe v. Wade passed in the state senate, 26 to 4, with Balint in favor.

In 2016, Balint opposed legislation to legalize marijuana despite her support for legalization, saying that she "believed this bill does not leave room for the home-grown and the small growers who would like to be a part of this new economy." She initially voted against marijuana legalization in a 16 to 13 vote in 2017, but became the only member in the state senate to change her vote after an amendment by Senator John S. Rodgers reduced the cultivation application fee that ranged from $15,000 to $25,000 to $3,000 to $7,500.

Syria
In 2023, Balint was among 56 Democrats to vote in favor of H.Con.Res. 21 which directed President Joe Biden to remove U.S. troops from Syria within 180 days.

Electoral history

See also
List of first openly LGBT politicians in the United States

References

External links

 Congresswoman Becca Balint official U.S. House website
Becca Balint for Congress campaign website

|-

|-

|-

1968 births
21st-century American politicians
21st-century American women politicians
21st-century American LGBT people
American Jews from Vermont
American people of Hungarian-Jewish descent
Democratic Party members of the United States House of Representatives from Vermont
Democratic Party Vermont state senators
Female members of the United States House of Representatives
Harvard Graduate School of Education alumni
Jewish American people in Vermont politics
Jewish members of the United States House of Representatives
Lesbian Jews
Lesbian politicians
LGBT members of the United States Congress
LGBT state legislators in Vermont
Living people
Majority leaders of the Vermont Senate
People from Brattleboro, Vermont
Smith College alumni
University of Massachusetts Amherst alumni
Women state legislators in Vermont